Sturry Pit is a  geological Site of Special Scientific Interest north-east of Canterbury in Kent. It is a Geological Conservation Review site.

This former gravel quarry has yielded many hand axes of Middle Acheulian style from the third terrace of the River Stour. It is important for understanding the chronologies of the terraces of the Thames basin in the Pleistocene.

There is access to the site from Sturry Hill.

References

Sites of Special Scientific Interest in Kent
Geological Conservation Review sites